Grottoes may refer to:
The plural form of Grotto (disambiguation)
Grottoes, Virginia, a town named for the nearby cave system Grand Caverns